The Islamic State–Taliban conflict is an ongoing armed conflict between the Islamic State and the Taliban in Afghanistan. The conflict escalated when militants who were affiliated with Islamic State – Khorasan Province killed Abdul Ghani, a senior Taliban commander in Logar province on 2 February 2015. Since then, the Taliban and IS-KP have engaged in clashes over the control of territory, mostly in eastern Afghanistan, but clashes have also occurred between the Taliban and IS-KP cells which are located in the north-west and south-west.

The Haqqani network, al-Qaeda and others support the Taliban, while IS is supported by the Mullah Dadullah Front and the pro-ISIS faction of the Islamic Movement of Uzbekistan. After the takeover of Kabul by the Taliban in 2021, several members of the Afghan intelligence agency and the Afghan national army have also joined the Islamic State – Khorasan Province. In February 2022, Pakistani officials acknowledged that ongoing violence was destabilizing the region. The High Council of the Islamic Emirate of Afghanistan, previously a breakaway Taliban faction, announced after the 2021 fall of Kabul that they have pledged allegiance to the Taliban and will dissolve.

Background 
During their original stint in power of the Islamic Emirate of Afghanistan in the late 1990s, the ruling Taliban had pursued a policy of suppressing Salafism; motivated by strict Deobandi tenets. During this period, the main issue of Salafist scholars was that Taliban was led by Maturidi Sufis. As a result of the unofficial Taliban bans on Ahl-i Hadith during the 1996-2001 era, several Salafis had shifted to Peshawar. However, after the US-led Invasion of Afghanistan in 2001, Taliban and Ahl-i Hadith allied to wage a common Jihad to resist the invasion. The Afghan Salafists decided to put aside their differences with the Taliban to join them in the “greater jihad” against the United States. Several Arab Salafis in Al-Qaeda rank and file would mediate the disputes between Afghan Salafists and Taliban; enabling them to unify for the more important religious duty of fighting against the U.S and its allies in Afghanistan.  Many Salafi commanders and Ahl-i Hadith organisations participated in the Taliban insurgency (2001-2021) under Afghan Taliban's command.

During the Taliban insurgency, in January 2015, IS established itself in Khorasan and formed IS-K. The main objective of IS-K was to occupy the land of Khorasan, that includes the country of Afghanistan. Even though the initial IS-K was formed by Taliban as well as Tehrik-i-Taliban Pakistan (TTP) defectors and thus ideologically similar, it became dominated by Salafists. The disgruntled members of TTP would establish IS-KP and shifted to the Nangarhar province. After its founding Pakistani leaders who defected from TTP were killed in US drone strikes, Afghan Salafists took charge of TTP.

The emergence of IS-K provided militant Afghan Salafists with an opportunity to set up a rival force, although Salafist support for the group waned as it proved ideologically "too extreme and brutal" for most Afghan Salafis. As a result, the majority of Afghan Salafis have remained supportive of the Taliban. In March 2020, major Pashtun Ahl-i Hadith ulema convened in Peshawar under the leadership of Shaikh Abdul Aziz Nooristani and Haji Hayatullah to pledge Bay'ah (oath of loyalty) to the Taliban and publicly condemn IS-K. The scholars also requested protection from the Afghan Taliban for the Ahl-i Hadith community.

After Taliban victory in the War in Afghanistan and Restoration of the Islamic Emirate, hundreds of Ahl-i Hadith ulema would gather to announce their Bay'ah (pledge of allegiance) to the Islamic Emirate of Afghanistan. Numerous Ahl-i Hadith clerics and their representatives held gatherings across various provinces of Afghanistan to re-affirm their backing of the Taliban and officially declare their support to the Taliban crackdown on IS-K.

Opposing forces 
By 2016, IS-K mostly consisted of eastern Afghans, Pakistanis, and foreign fighters from Central Asia. The latter were mainly former members of the Islamic Jihad Union and the Turkistan Islamic Party. In addition, there were a small number of Arabs. Throughout its existence, IS-K has operated in a very limited area, mainly concentrated in select provinces in eastern Afghanistan, most importantly Nangarhar and Kunar. By 2016, it had appointed shadow governors in other regions as well, but not exerted much influence outside its traditional bases. The group is known to receive support by the Islamic State's central command in form of money and combat trainers from Iraq and Syria. IS-K's combat strength has fluctuated greatly over the years, but has mostly remained in the low thousands.

During the Taliban insurgency

2015
On 2 February, militants affiliated with IS-K killed Abdul Ghani, a Taliban commander, in Logar province.

On 26 May, Asif Nang, governor of Farah province, said the Taliban have been fighting against IS militants for the past three days in Farah province. The clash left 10 Taliban and 15 IS militants dead.

In May, IS-K militants captured Maulvi Abbas, a Taliban commander who was leading a small squad of insurgent fighters in Nangarhar province.

In June, IS-K militants beheaded 10 Taliban fighters who were fleeing an Afghan military offensive according to a spokesman of Afghan army corps responsible for the region.

On 9 November, fighting had broken out between different Taliban factions in the Zabul Province of Afghanistan. Fighters loyal to the new Taliban leader Akhtar Mansour began to fight a pro-IS faction, led by Mullah Mansoor Dadullah. According to Afghan security and local officials, Akhtar Mansour had sent as many as 450 Taliban fighters to crush Mullah Mansoor and Islamic State elements in Zabul. Dadullah's faction received support from IS during the clashes, and IS fighters also joined in on the fighting alongside Dadullah, including foreign fighters from Chechnya and Uzbekistan. Dadullah and IS were eventually defeated by Mansour's forces. Hajji Momand Nasratyar, the district governor of Arghandab, said the fighting took place in three districts of Zabul province and 86 IS militants and 26 Taliban fighters were killed in the clash. Taliban also reported to have killed several IS militants who were responsible for beheading of seven Hazara civilians a few days back.

Hajji Atta Jan, the Zabul provincial council chief, said the offensive by Mullah Mansour's fighters was so intense, that at least three Islamic State commanders, all of them ethnic Uzbeks, had surrendered. They were also asking others IS militants to do the same. Radio Free Europe/Radio Liberty, while quoting sources from Southern Afghanistan, reported that some 70 IS militants were also captured in the clash by the Taliban.

On 13 November, Ghulam Jelani Farahi, an Afghan police chief, said that Mullah Mansoor Dadullah was killed in a clash with Taliban.

2016
In January, hundreds of Taliban fighters launched an assault against IS bases in eastern Afghanistan. Taliban fighters were successful in capturing two districts from IS in eastern Afghanistan, but it failed to drive the group out of their stronghold in the Nazyan district in Nangarhar province. Ataullah Khogyani, a spokesman for the provincial governor, said that 26 IS militants and 5 Taliban fighters were killed in the clashes in Nangarhar.

On 2 February, US carried out airstrikes targeting IS radio station in eastern Afghanistan. The strike destroyed the radio station and killed 29 IS militants.

In March, Taliban factions led by Muhammad Rasul and opposed to Mansoor, began to fight against his loyalists in the group. During the fighting, dozens were reported killed.

On 26 April, Hazrat Hussain Mashriqwal, a provincial police spokesman, said that 10 IS militants, including an IS commander, and 6 Taliban fighters were killed in a clash in Nangarhar. 15 IS militants and 4 Taliban fighters were also wounded during the same clash according to the spokesman.

On 19 May, local government officials reported that a clash took place between IS and Taliban in Achin and Khogyani district of Nangarhar province. 15 IS militants and 3 Taliban fighters were killed in Achin district, and the remaining were killed in Khogyani. 4 Taliban commanders were also among the dead.

On 13 August, US defence officials said that ISIL's top leader, Hafiz Saeed Khan, was killed in a drone strike on 26 July in Nangarhar province.

On 30 October, Ajmal Zahid, a governor of Golestan district, said that ISIL's commander, Abdul Razaq Mehdi, was killed by Taliban fighters in Farah province.

2017
On 13 April 2017, the United States dropped the largest non-nuclear bomb, known as the GBU-43/B Massive Ordnance Air Blast (MOAB) Mother of All Bombs near Momand village upon a Nangahar's Achin District village in eastern Afghanistan to destroy tunnel complexes used by the Islamic State of Iraq and the Levant – Khorasan Province (ISIL-KP or ISIS-K). The Guardian reported that following the strike, US and Afghan forces conducted clearing operations and airstrikes in the area and assessed the damage.

On 26 April, a fight occurred after IS captured 3 drug dealers who were involved in selling opium for the Taliban in Jowzjan Province. An Afghan National Police spokesman stated that the Taliban attacked IS in response, saying "The clashes erupted when group of armed Taliban attacked Daesh militants [to secure] the release of 3 drug smugglers who came here to pay 10 million afghanis [$14,780] to the Taliban for a deal." The Taliban's spokesman, Zabihullah Mujahid had also confirmed clashes were ongoing with IS at the time, without providing details on the nature of the fight or reasons. Mohammad Reza Ghafori, a spokesman for the provincial governor, said that the clashes between Taliban and IS-K had left 76 Taliban and 15 IS militants dead. IS militants also seized 2 districts from the Taliban, according to the spokesman.

On 24 May, a clash between the Taliban and IS occurred, and at that time, it had reportedly been the largest clash between the two with 22 casualties, 13 of which were IS fighters, and 9 Taliban fighters, according to a Taliban official. The clashes occurred near Iran's border with Afghanistan. The Taliban had attacked an IS camp in the area, an IS commander, who was formerly a Taliban member, said that there was an agreement between the Taliban and IS not to attack each other until there was a dialogue. The commander claimed that the Taliban had violated the agreement and attacked the IS camp. The IS commander also claimed the attack was coordinated with the Iranian military, and that there were Iranians filming dead IS fighters. The Taliban splinter faction Fidai Mahaz has also criticized the Taliban for its relationship with Iran. Days before the battle, the Taliban reportedly met with Iranian officials to discuss regional issues. A spokesman for Fidai Mahaz claimed the meeting was held at the request of the Taliban, as it was weary of the expansion of IS in the country, which also concerned the Iranian government. The spokesman also said that the Taliban received US$3 million in cash, 3,000 arms, 40 trucks, and the ammunition from Iran's intelligence services, in order to fight IS near the Iranian border, although a Taliban spokesman denied the allegations.

On 27 November, Taliban executed one of its senior commanders for colluding with IS. A week before, IS fighters were mass executed by their fellow militants in Achin district, according to a provincial government spokesman. However, the spokesman did not provide any additional detail, and neither did IS release any official statement on killing its own members.

2018

On 20 June, after the talks between the Russian government and the Taliban, US assistant secretary of state Alice Wells condemned the Russian government's position on the Taliban that included backing for the group against IS, stating it gave the Taliban legitimacy and challenged the recognized Afghan government.

In July, the Taliban launched an offensive against IS in the Jowzjan province.  According to a surrendered IS commander, the Taliban had amassed 2,000 fighters for the offensive against IS. The fighters from the Islamic Movement of Uzbekistan, who had sworn allegiance to IS, were also present fighting alongside IS against the Taliban. During the fighting, 3,500 to 7,000 civilians were displaced. By the end of July, IS's hold in the region was reduced to 2 villages, all thanks to the Taliban's campaign. In response, they requested support from the Afghan government, and also agreed to put down their arms in exchange for protection from the Taliban. The Afghan Air Force later carried out airstrikes against the Taliban in exchange for IS's surrender in the region. The agreement between the Afghan government and IS created controversy afterwards. On 17 July, IS militants killed 15 Taliban militants and injured 5 others during a raid on a house belonging to a Taliban commander in Sar-e Pol. Abdul Qayuom Baqizoi, the police chief of Sar-e Pol, told Associated Press that Taliban and IS fighters have been fighting each other in Jowzjan and Sar-e Pol for more than two months, killing hundreds on both sides.

In August, during the negotiations between the US government and the Taliban in Doha, the Taliban had requested that the US ends airstrikes on the Taliban, as well as provide support to the group in order to fight IS.

2019
On 22 June, clashes were reported in Kunar between the Taliban and IS, by an Afghan government official. The official also claimed that the Afghan military had killed some IS fighters in the area, and that the Taliban was active in the area as well.

On 29 June, IS released photos of weapons captured from the Taliban. On the same day, IS published a video of its fighters renewing their Bayah to Abu Bakr al-Baghdadi. In the video, fighters criticized the Taliban for engaging in peace talks and called upon Taliban fighters to join IS.

On 1 August, the Amaq News Agency claimed that IS had killed 5 Taliban members during clashes in Kunar.

On 1 October, IS claimed to have killed and wounded 20 Taliban fighters in Tora Bora.

2020 
In March 2020, the Afghan Salafist Council under its emir, Shaikh Abdul Aziz Nooristani, met with Taliban leaders and pledged loyalty to their movement. Salafists had previously provided crucial support to IS-K, but recognized that the latter's position had greatly declined after its defeats in Nangarhar and Kunar. The Salafist Council, represented by 32 scholars and military leaders, stated that they were in no way loyal to IS-K, and wanted to be left out of the Islamic State–Taliban conflict. The Taliban leadership accepted the pledge of loyalty, exploiting it in its propaganda.

In October 2020, former Politico reporter Wesley Morgan revealed that United States special operations forces, longtime foes of the Taliban, had been conducting drone strikes against IS-K to give the Taliban an advantage in the field. According to Morgan, the operators were jokingly referred to as the "Taliban Air Force" and instead of communicating directly with Taliban commanders, they would monitor Taliban communications and decide when was the best time to strike. On 10 December 2020, General Kenneth McKenzie Jr., head of U.S. Central Command, confirmed that the U.S. had assisted the Taliban via opportunistic drone strikes, saying that they did not coordinate operations with the Taliban, but took advantage of them fighting a "common enemy" to conduct their own operations. Gen. McKenzie said the strikes occurred several months prior when IS-K was holding ground in Nangarhar Province and elsewhere in eastern Afghanistan.

After the Taliban's takeover of Afghanistan

Renewed Islamic State attacks and anti-Salafist purge 

The Taliban finally succeeded in taking over Afghanistan from the Islamic Republic during a large-scale offensive in summer 2021. Kabul fell on 15 August 2021, prompting the leaders of the IS-K to denounce the Taliban takeover of Afghanistan. The Taliban immediately moved to contain or purge potential opponents, including Islamic State supporters and Salafists. Across the country, the Taliban ordered the closure of Salafist mosques seminaries and tried to arrest prominent Salafist scholars, prompting many to go into hiding. Among those targeted by the new Taliban authorities were Salafi clerics who had publicly opposed IS-K. Researcher Abdul Sayed argued that the purge was probably organized by hardline anti-Salafist elements within the Taliban and more motivated by long-time resentment than fears about Salafi support for a future IS-K insurgency. On 16 August, the Taliban claimed to have killed around 150 IS-K fighters, including its former chief Abu Umar Khurasani, while prisoners were being released from a jail in Kabul. However, many IS-K militants were able to rejoin the IS-K ranks because of spree of prison breaks across the country organized by the Taliban.

On 26 August, a suicide bombing and a mass shooting occurred near Abbey Gate at Hamid Karzai International Airport in Kabul, Afghanistan. The attack began hours after the United States' State Department told Americans outside the airport to leave due to a terrorist threat. At least 185 people were killed in the attacks, including 13 U.S. service members. The Taliban condemned the attack, saying "evil circles will be strictly stopped". The Taliban later announced that they would take every possible measure to capture IS-KP leader Shahab al-Muhajir. The same day, Saifullah Mohammed, Taliban's CID chief, told The Times that they had captured 6 militants belonging to IS-K following a gun battle in western side of Kabul.

Taliban militants kidnapped the influential Salafi cleric, Mullah Abu Obaidullah Mutawakil on 28 August; he was "brutal[ly]" murdered one week later. Taliban spokesman Zabiullah Mujahid denied the Taliban's role in the killing of Mutawakil, but also did not condemn the murder. Even though Mutawakil was described as an IS-K sympathiser and a large number of his students were part of IS-K, he had not officially backed the Islamic State. IS-K did not offer prayers for him after his demise, stating that he had not been loyal to the Islamic State's caliphate. On 9 November 2021, Reuters journalist James MacKenzie stated that "frequent, smaller atrocities" in the conflict are "less commonly reported." Aside from the ISIS stronghold of Nangarhar, other affected areas include Ghazni in central Afghanistan, Herat in the west, Balkh in the north, and Paktia, Paktika and Khost in the southeast.

Islamic State insurgency 
On 6 September, Neda Mohammad, a Taliban governor for Nangarhar province, vowed to continue fighting IS-K militants. Nangarhar province is a stronghold of IS-K and the governor says that since taking over Nangarhar, his forces had arrested 70–80 suspected militants belonging to IS-K in Nangarhar province.

On 8 September, Taliban killed Farooq Bengalzai, an ISKP head for a Pakistan's province, in Nimroz, Afghanistan.

On 18 September, 7 people were killed when 4 bombs planted by suspected IS-KP members exploded in Jalalabad targeting Taliban patrols.

On 22 September, 2 Taliban fighters and a civilian were killed by ISIL gunmen who attacked a checkpoint in Ghawchak district of Jalalabad, security sources and witnesses said.

On 1 October, Taliban forces raided an ISKP base in the city of Charikar, north of Kabul. The Taliban claimed they had killed and arrested a number of ISKP members.

On 2 October, suspected ISKP militants shot dead 2 Taliban fighters and 2 civilians in Jalalabad.

On 3 October, an explosion at the entrance to the Eidgah Mosque in Kabul leaves at least 5 dead, where a memorial service was held for the mother of Taliban spokesman Zabihullah Mujahid. ISKP later claimed responsibility for the attack, claiming it killed Taliban militants.

On 4 October, the Taliban says it has "destroyed an IS–K cell" in Kabul following yesterday's bombing at a mosque during the memorial for the mother of Taliban spokesman Zabihullah Mujahid. Mujahid says that a special Taliban unit carried out the operation and that the base was destroyed and everyone inside was killed.

On 6 October, 7 people, including at least 1 Taliban fighter, were killed in a grenade attack on a religious school in Khost. ISKP claimed responsibility for the attack.

On 7 October, the Taliban announced that they had arrested 4 ISKP members after a raid in Paghman district, west of Kabul. On the same day, ISIS claimed responsibility for the capture and execution of a Taliban fighter in District 2 of Jalalabad.

On 8 October, a Uyghur Islamic State militant, by the name of Muhammad al-Uyghuri killed 55–100 people and injured dozens more after launching a suicide bombing on a Shi'ite mosque in Kunduz.

On 9 October, Taliban spokesman Suhail Shaheen announced that there would be no co-operation with the U.S. to combat ISKP, saying that the Taliban are 'able to deal with ISIS independently'.

On 10 October, ISKP claimed responsibility for the assassination of 2 Taliban fighters in District 7 of Jalalabad.

On 14 October, a bomb killed a Taliban police chief in Asadabad, capital of Kunar province, Afghanistan. They also claim that 11 people were injured, including 4 Taliban soldiers.

On 15 October, a bomb explosion occurred in Kandahar at the Shia 'Imam Bargah mosque', killing at least 65 people and wounding at least 70 more. ISIS claimed responsibility for the attack.

On 20 October, the Taliban announced they had arrested at least 250 ISKP operatives between mid-September and mid-October 2021.

On 23 October, ISKP claimed responsibility for shooting 2 Taliban fighters dead in District 1 of Jalalabad city.

On 24 October, a bomb attack in Afghanistan has left at least 2 civilians dead on Saturday, 1 being a child, and four wounded. The device placed on the road in eastern Afghanistan was aimed at a Taliban vehicle. On the same day, it was reported that ISKP had raised a flag in a village in Uruzgan Province and that the militants were distributing leaflets at mosques in nearby villages.

On 25 October, 17 people were killed in clashes between gunmen and Taliban forces in Herat. On the same day it was announced that Tajikistan and China had reached an agreement for China to fund construction for a new Tajik military base and that Chinese forces can completely operate a military base near the Afghan border.

On 31 October, at least a hundred IS militants reportedly surrendered to the Taliban security forces in Nangarhar province, as part of an operation to suppress the insurgent formation in the country.

In the month of October, a former Afghan national army officer, who recently joined ISKP ranks, was killed in clash with Taliban fighters. The former officer commanded the Afghan military's weapons and ammunition depot in Gardez before the Taliban takeover.

Since the Taliban takeover, the violence in Nangahar province has escalated with near-daily attacks claimed by the Islamic State. The Taliban responded by deploying an additional 1,300 fighters in the province in the month of October with the aim to increase the number of operations conducted against the ISKP fighters in the province. Talibans have also carried out night raids against suspected ISKP fighters in the province and many of the hundreds arrested during those raids have either disappeared or turned up dead. The Taliban's harsh crackdown in the province against the suspected ISKP fighters has resulted in a number of human right violations by the Taliban fighters, according to Nangahar residents. Islamic State has also used Taliban's harsh crackdown as a part of its recruitment propaganda calling on Nangahar residents to rise up and resist the Taliban. Nangahar residents say that the Taliban fighters in the province are not familiar with the area and have no way to check the intelligence they receive about Islamic State targets. So the Taliban fighters have started killing anyone they suspect of working for the Islamic State, according to the residents. Washington Post reports that only a few Taliban fighters have the necessary training or experience to conduct precision-based operations in urban areas. As the Taliban are more adopted to guerrilla warfare, they are therefore still adjusting to maintain security during peacetime.

By early November, IS-KP in Nangahar was repeatedly assassinating ex-republicans and pro-Taliban figures and attacked patrols with such a frequency that the Taliban government ordered its fighters in the province to no longer leave settlements at night.

On 2 November, the 2021 Kabul hospital attack took place where assailants attacked the Daoud Khan Military Hospital with guns and suicide bombers killing at least 25 people and wounding at least 50 more people. A senior Taliban commander, Mawlawi Hamdullah Mukhlis, was killed in the attack. He was the head of the Kabul military corps and was 1 of the first "senior" Taliban commanders to enter the abandoned Afghan presidential palace on August 15. The Taliban blamed ISKP for the attack and claimed that they killed at least 4 militants in a shootout. On the same day, ISIL claimed responsibility for killing a Taliban judge in a gun attack in PD-2, Jalalabad.

On 7 November, at least 3 members of the Taliban security forces were killed and 3 others wounded in a series of attacks in Jalalabad. "Two blasts hit the Taliban, then the ISKP militants engaged in a gunfight and finally managed to escape".

On 10 November, a spokesman for the General Directorate of Intelligence, the new name of the Afghan spy agency under Taliban rule, told reporters in Kabul that they have arrested nearly 600 members of ISKP including “high-ranking” commanders.

On 13 November, at least 3 people were killed including Afghan journalist Hameed Saighani after a bus exploded in a majority Shia part of Kabul city. ISKP later claimed responsibility.

On 14 November, ISKP militants gunned down and killed a Taliban fighter in Nangarhar.

On 15 November, 4 ISKP members and 3 civilians were killed in a Taliban raid on a suspected ISKP hideout in Kandahar.

On 18 November, a UN assessment concluded that members of ISIS-KP were now present in all of Afghanistan's 34 provinces.

On 20 November, 3 Taliban fighters were killed after ISKP militants opened fire on their car in Jalalabad city.

On 22 November, the United States revealed the names of and declared four main leaders of ISKP, including a funder of the organisation, as Specially Designated Global Terrorists (SDGTs). On the same day, ISKP claimed responsibility for shooting and killing a Taliban fighter and a former Afghan intelligence operative after their car was fired upon on Jalalabad.

On 25 November, 2 Taliban members were shot and killed by ISKP militants in Jalalabad city.

On 30 November, 3 ISKP militants were killed in a Taliban raid on a house in the city of Jalalabad. Four Taliban fighters were wounded in the operation.

On 4 December, ISKP released a photo on telegram showing an IED explosion that targeted a Taliban patrol vehicle in Kabul.

On 5 December, ISKP claimed responsibility for killing two Taliban fighters after shooting at their car in the city of Jalalabad.

On 6 December, ISKP claimed responsibility for shooting dead a Taliban fighter in Taloqan. Making this ISKP's first claim of responsibility in Takhar Province since the Taliban takeover.

On 9 December, during an interview, the spokesman for the Islamic Emirate of Afghanistan, Zabiullah Mujahid, claimed that since the re-foundation of the Islamic Emirate, 25 ISKP hideouts had been destroyed and that 670 ISKP fighters had been arrested. He also stated that “Daesh is no longer a big threat in Afghanistan. It was a small group that has now been dismantled in Kabul and Jalalabad.”

On 14 December, Nada Al-Nashif, the UN deputy high commissioner for human rights, announced that the Taliban had been responsible for at least 50 executions of suspected ISKP members, including hangings and beheadings. The same report also stated that the Taliban had conducted at least 72 executions of former Afghan security personnel.

2022 
On 4 January, ISKP claimed to have abducted and executed a Taliban 'spy' in the Mamandra region of Nangarhar.

On 16 January, ISKP released footage of one of their operatives shooting dead a Taliban fighter in Herat.

On 23 January, ISKP claimed responsibility for shooting dead a Taliban fighter in Taloqan.

On 30 January, two Taliban fighters were targeted by ISKP gunmen in the Sarkani region of Kunar, on the Afghan-Pakistani border. One Taliban fighter was killed and the other was wounded.

On 13 February, during a televised interview with CNN's Fareed Zakaria, Pakistan Prime Minister Imran Khan urges the world to work with the Taliban in order to resolve the ongoing regional humanitarian crisis which resulted in part from the conflict.

On 22 February 2022, Pakistan officials acknowledged that the ongoing conflict was destabilizing Afghanistan and also threatening the stability of Pakistan.

On 4 March 2022, an ISKP suicide bomber attacked a Shiite mosque in the Pakistani city of Peshawar, killing 63 worshippers.

On 2 April, ISKP claimed to have bombed a vehicle containing Taliban militants with an IED in District 5 of Kabul.

On 11 April 2022 Islamic State transforms and grows in Pakistan and Afghanistan according to a report by the AP news agency- A concerted focus on “social media warfare” is critical to advance on the ideological battlefield but also in order to counter the pull of “enchanting” social media influencers, ISIS Khorasan declared in a new issue of the group's English-language magazine. In their magazine "Voice of Khurasan", ISIS Khorasan criticized the management and thinking of the Taliban.

On 19 April 2022, At least 6 people were killed and 17 injured in bomb attacks on two schools in Kabul. The students who attended these centers are from the Shiite Hazara minority, which is the population that lives in the Dashte Barchi neighborhood to the west of the Afghan capital. The Taliban spokesman for the Ministry of the Interior has warned that the death toll could increase. Several injured are in serious condition. No one has immediately claimed responsibility for the attacks but it is suspected that the Afghan affiliate of the Islamic State is guilty of the events

The Afghan affiliate of the Islamic State extremist group has claimed responsibility for a series of attacks against the country's Shiite minority during the week of 18–24 April 2022. The bomb attack on a mosque and religious school in northern Afghanistan, from 22 April, caused the death of 33 people, including students. Added to these attacks are those that occurred in two educational centers in the Shiite Hazara minority neighborhood of Dashte Barchi, in western Kabul, causing at least six deaths and 25 injuries, according to official data. several smaller explosions in recent days in different parts of Afghanistan, including another detonation today in a Kabul neighborhood that initially caused no casualties. There was also a roadside mine explosion yesterday in the eastern province of Nangarhar, which left at least four members of the Taliban security forces dead and one wounded. In the city of Kunduz, another detonation against a vehicle left four dead and 18 injured, including children. The Taliban announced the arrest of a former leader of IS-K in the northern region of Balkh, whose capital is Mazar-e-Sharif.

On Friday, 29 April 2022, the last day of the holy month of Ramadan, there was a new attack against a Sufi Mosque in Afghanistan as part of the wave of violence that is sweeping the country. The explosion occurred in the west of the capital, Kabul, during prayers and killed 50 people, The same day two high-voltage towers in Parwan province were bombed on the night of Friday, 29 April 2022, cutting off electricity to the capital and neighboring provinces. Millions of people in 11 provinces of Afghanistan suffered blackouts on Saturday, 30 April 2022 after two power transmission towers were blown up west of the capital Kabul.

On 25 May, at least 9 people were killed in a triple bombing targeting mini-busses in the city of Mazar-i-Sharif. IS-KP later claimed responsibility.

On 18 June, two people were killed and seven others were injured after gunmen attacked a Sikh temple in Kabul. ISKP claimed responsibility, claiming the attack was in revenge for 'insults made by members of India's ruling Bharatiya Janata Party about the Prophet Mohammed'. Seven ISKP gunmen were killed in a firefight with Taliban forces after the attack.

On 3 August, two Taliban policemen and three Islamic State gunmen are killed during a gunbattle at a hideout in Kabul. Four other officers are wounded.

On 5 August, 8 people were killed and 18 others were injured after a bomb exploded at a Shia gathering in Kabul. ISKP later claimed responsibility.

On 11 August, a senior Taliban cleric, Sheikh Rahimullah Haqqani, was blown up and killed in a suicide bombing during an Islamic seminary in Kabul. ISKP later claimed responsibility for the attack.

On 17 August, a mosque in Kabul was attacked during evening prayers. It was reported that happen a huge explosion with 21 killed including the mosque's imam Amir Muhammad Kabuli. Another 33 people were injured.

On 2 September, a bombing at a mosque in Herat killed at least 18 people and wounded 23 others. A senior Taliban cleric, Mujib Rahman Ansari, was killed in the blast.

On 5 September, At least eight dead in an attack claimed by the self-styled Islamic State in Afghanistan. In the explosion, near the Russian embassy, ​​a security guard and the second secretary of the delegation have died. In addition, four Afghan Taliban police officers have also been killed. An unclear number of people were injured in the bombing. RIA Novosti reported 15 to 20 wounded

On 23 September 2022 a car bomb exploded outside a mosque in the Wazir Akbar Khan neighbourhood of Kabul, Afghanistan. The explosion happened just as worshippers were leaving the building after finishing Friday prayers. Police said that seven people had been killed and 41 injured.

On 30 September 2022, a suicide bomber blew himself up at the Kaaj education center in Dashte Barchi, a Hazara neighborhood in Kabul, killing at least 52 people and injuring 110 others.

On 5 October 2022, 4 people were blown up and killed and a further 25 were wounded by an explosion at a mosque at the Ministry of Interior Affairs in Kabul.

On 22 October 2022, The Taliban killed six ISKP members during a raid in Kabul. A Taliban spokesman says they were responsible for the September 2022 Kabul mosque bombing and the September 2022 Kabul school bombing.

On 30 November 2022, at least 15 people were killed in a bombing at a madrasa in Aybak.

On 2 December 2022, 2 men disguised in burqas attack a mosque while former Mujahideen leader and Afghan prime minister Gulbuddin Hekmatyar, was inside. The attackers killed a civilian and injured two others before being shot dead by security guards. Hekmatyar was unhurt.

On 12 December 2022, insurgents attacked a hotel popular with Chinese nationals in Kabul, Afghanistan. At least three civilians were killed. Eighteen others, including foreigners, are reported to be among those injured. Islamic State – Khorasan Province claimed responsibility for the attack. Kabul's Emergency Hospital, run by an Italian non-profit near the attacked hotel in the Shahr-e-Naw area, reported receiving 21 casualties - 18 injured and three dead on arrival.

On 27 December 2022, ISIS claimed responsibility for a car bombing that killed Abdulhaq Abu Omar, the Taliban police chief of the country’s northeastern Badakhshan province. Omar is believed to be the highest-ranking Taliban security official slain since the Taliban took over Afghanistan in August 2021.

2023 
On 1 January, at least 10 people were killed and 8 others were wounded by an explosion at the entrance to the military airport in Kabul, the Afghan capital, on New Year's morning (01.01.2023), the Afghan Interior Ministry reported without providing further details or the exact number of victims. The jihadist group Islamic State (IS) today claimed responsibility for the attack against a surveillance post in the military zone of the Kabul airport and identified the suicide bomber, the same one who attacked a hotel frequented by Chinese citizens three weeks ago in the Afghan capital.

On 5 January, a Taliban spokesperson stated that its forces have killed eight Islamic State insurgents, including foreign nationals, accusing them of having a "main role in the attack on [Longan] hotel". These killings, along with seven arrests, took place in a series of raids in Kabul and the western Nimruz Province.

On 11 January, at least 20 people were killed in a suicide bombing outside of the Ministry of Foreign Affairs in Kabul according to Information Ministry official Ustad Fareedun. Responsibility for the attack was claimed by the Islamic State.

On 27 February, Taliban forces killed two Islamic State militants who they described as "key commanders".

On 9 March, three people, including Mohammad Dawood Muzamil, the Taliban-appointed governor of Balkh Province, are killed by an explosion at his office.

Notes

References

Works cited
 
 
 

Conflicts in 2015
2010s conflicts
2020s conflicts
2015 in Afghanistan
2010s in Afghanistan
2020s in Afghanistan
Islamic State of Iraq and the Levant in Afghanistan
ISIL-conflict in Afghanistan
Afghanistan conflict (1978–present)
War in Afghanistan (2001–2021)
Wars involving the Islamic State of Iraq and the Levant
Wars involving the Taliban